KCMT (92.1 FM) is an American Regional Mexican radio station that serves Tucson, Arizona. KCMT is licensed to broadcast from Green Valley, Arizona (a southern suburb of Tucson), and broadcasts on the frequency of 92.1 MHz. KCMT is owned by small radio company Lotus Communications.  Its studios and transmitter are located separately in Northwest Tucson.

KCMT has been the highest-rated Spanish-language radio station in the Tucson radio market in the Arbitron ratings.

On March 21, 2014, KCMT moved from 102.1 FM to 92.1 FM, swapping frequencies with alternative rock-formatted KFMA.

See also
 List of radio stations in Arizona

External links
Official KCMT Website

Mexican-American culture in Arizona
CMT
Regional Mexican radio stations in the United States
Radio stations established in 1983
1983 establishments in Arizona
CMT
Lotus Communications stations